The Ōta River Bridge (also rendered in rōmaji as Otagawaohashi, also called Otagawa Bridge or Otagawa Ohashi Bridge) is a bridge on the Ōta River in Hiroshima, Japan. It is the southernmost of all the crossings of the Ōta River and carries Route 3 (the Hiroshima Minami Route) of the Hiroshima Expressway.

Construction
A decision to build a bridge as part of the expressway system was made in 2004. A design competition committee was formed in late 2008 and received entries from 18 Japanese and three international firms. The winning design by Kenichi Nishiyama  of  collaborating with Yoko Kabaki, Akiyoshi Nii, and Hitoshi Okamura, was selected in July, 2009.

The bridge was built by Shimizu Corporation and finished in 2014. The bridge design had to comply with height restriction laws due to its proximity to Hiroshima–Nishi Airport.

The bridge, a composite prestressed concrete continuous rigid frame box girder with steel arch bridge stiffener, won the Japan Society of Civil Engineers Tanaka Award.

Notes

References

External links

 April, 2014

Bridges in Japan
Bridges completed in 2014
Shimizu Corporation
Ōta River